The 1908–09 Princeton Tigers men's ice hockey season was the 10th season of play for the program.

Season
Unlike the previous year, Princeton got off to a good start, winning its first two games with good defensive effort. The Tigers entered their winter break with a possible seven games on the slate before the IHA schedule began. While Princeton ended up playing five games, they won four of the matches and swept a three-game series against Yale, shutting the Elis out in all three games.

Right after the break the Intercollegiate Hockey Association schedule began with a match against Columbia that Princeton took 5–2. Ten days later the Tigers headed into their match with Harvard with a 7–1 record and hopes of earning their second championship. Goaltender Clarence Peacock was the star of the game, stopping 21 shots that came his way but the Crimson press turned out to be just too much and the Tigers fell 2–3. After a second loss in conference play the Tigers lost any chance they had at capturing the title but the team ended their season with an exciting game against the Bulldogs that saw four overtime goals scored in a 5–5 draw.

William H. Myers Jr. served as team manager.

Roster

Standings

Schedule and Results

|-
!colspan=12 style=";" | Regular Season

References

Princeton Tigers men's ice hockey seasons
Princeton
Princeton
Princeton
Princeton